Norodom Suramarit (6 March 1896 – 3 April 1960) was King of Cambodia from 3 March 1955 until his death in 1960. He was the father of King Norodom Sihanouk and the grandfather of Cambodia's current king, Norodom Sihamoni. Suramarit was born in Phnom Penh to Prince Norodom Sutharot. When his grandfather King Norodom died in 1904, Norodom's brother Sisowath took the throne. King Sisowath died in 1927 and was succeeded by his son Monivong.

Suramarit married Monivong's daughter Sisowath Kosamak. Upon Monivong's death in 1941, Sihanouk, Suramarit's son and Monivong's grandson, was selected as the new king. In 1955, Sihanouk abdicated in favor of his father. He was formally crowned on 6 March 1956, which coincided with his 60th birthday.

Following Suramarit's death in 1960, Sihanouk became Chief of State, while Suramarit's wife Sisowath Kosamak became Queen. Suramarit was given the posthumous title of Preah Karuna Preah Norodom Suramarit Preah Moha Kachanakkot.

Honours

National
  Knight Grand Cross of the Royal Order of Cambodia (1941)

Foreign
  Grand Commander of the Most Glorious Order of the Truth (Agga Maha Thiri Thudhamma) (Burma)
  Commander of the Order of the Legion of Honour (French Republic, 1939)
  Grand Officer of the Order of the Legion of Honour (French Republic)
  Knight Grand Cordon of the Supreme Order of the Crysanthemun (Empire of Japan)
  Knight Grand Cross of the Order of the Million Elephants and the White Parasol (Kingdom of Laos, 1955)
  Knight of the Most Illustrious Order of the Royal House of Chakri (Kingdom of Thailand)
  Knight Grand Cordon of the Order of the Dragon of Annam (Empire of Vietnam)
  Knight Grand Cross of the National Order of Vietnam (Empire of Vietnam)
  Honorary Recipient of the Order of the Crown of the Realm (Malaysia)
  Honorary Recipient of the Order of Suvorov, 1st class (Soviet Union, 7 July 1956)
  Knight Grand Cordon of the Order of the White Lion (Czechoslovakia, 14 July 1956)

References

Norodom Suramarit
Norodom Suramarit
Cambodian Buddhists
20th-century Cambodian monarchs
Cambodian Buddhist monarchs
House of Norodom
People from Phnom Penh
Grand Officiers of the Légion d'honneur
Commandeurs of the Légion d'honneur
Knights Grand Cross of the Royal Order of Cambodia
Recipients of the Order of the Dragon of Annam
Recipients of the National Order of Vietnam
Recipients of the Order of Suvorov, 1st class